Whelan Camp is a historic late period Adirondack Great Camp and national historic district located on Raquette Lake at Long Lake in Hamilton County, New York.  The district includes four contributing buildings and one contributing structure.  It is composed of a large, sprawling Shingle Style main camp and five supporting buildings constructed between 1915 and 1918.  The buildings include the Main Lodge, Garcon Lodge, Power House, lean-to, and workshop.

It was added to the National Register of Historic Places in 1989.

References

Adirondack Great Camps
Historic districts on the National Register of Historic Places in New York (state)
Shingle Style architecture in New York (state)
Residential buildings completed in 1915
Buildings and structures in Hamilton County, New York
Residential buildings on the National Register of Historic Places in New York (state)
National Register of Historic Places in Hamilton County, New York